Radebeul Zitzschewig station is a railway station in the Große Kreisstadt of Radebeul, Saxony, Germany. The station lies on the Pirna–Coswig railway.

Gallery

References

External links
 

Zitschewig
Railway stations in Germany opened in 1902
RadebeulZitzschewig